The Santa Lucia Stroncone Astronomical Observatory is an astronomical observatory located at  altitude in Stroncone, near the city of Terni, in Umbria, north central Italy.

It is an active center for the discovery of asteroids. Stroncone is also known as IAU/MPC observatory 589. It is located at longitude 12º38'24"E, latitude 42º30'55"N.

The main-belt asteroid 5609 Stroncone, discovered by amateur astronomer Antonio Vagnozzi at Stroncone in 1993, was named after the suburb where the discovering observatory is located.

List of discovered minor planets

See also 
 List of asteroid-discovering observatories
 List of astronomical observatories
 
 List of observatory codes

References

External links 
 Pictures of the Observatory
 Astronomy from wide-field imaging: proceedings of the 161st Symposium of the International Astronomical Union, Brian Marsden, IAU, 1994

Astronomical observatories in Italy
Minor-planet discovering observatories